Kevin Scott Conway (born ) is a Canadian former ice hockey player who played mainly in the United Kingdom. He is a member of the British Ice Hockey Hall of Fame.

Playing career

Junior
Conway was born in Sault Ste. Marie, Ontario. He began his major-junior ice hockey career with the Oshawa Generals in the Ontario Hockey League (OHL) during the 1980–81 season.

The following season, 1981–82, Conway joined the Sault Ste. Marie Greyhounds also in the OHL. He helped them to finish second in their division and to the quarter finals of the playoffs. Staying with the Greyhounds again for the 1982–83 season, Conway helped the team to finish first in their division, win the Hamilton Spectator Trophy and to the final of the playoffs where they were defeated by the Oshawa Generals.

After just two games with the Greyhounds at the start of the 1983–84 season, Conway moved on to play with the Kingston Canadians. Although the Canadians finished bottom of their division that season and did not qualify for the playoffs, Conway still finished as the league's top scorer and in sixth place in the scoring leaders chart with 65 goals and 65 assists for 130 points in 63 games. Conway also won the William Hanley Trophy as the league's most sportsmanlike player.

Club
Conway started his professional career by signing for the Toledo Goaldiggers in the International Hockey League (IHL) and playing ten games for them during the 1983–84 season. The following season, 1984–85, Conway split between the Goaldiggers and the Salt Lake Golden Eagles also of the IHL.

In 1985, Conway signed for the Ayr Bruins in the Premier Division of the British Hockey League (BHL). Conway played for the Bruins for one season — taking the goal scoring record and being named to the 1986 Premier Division all-star team — before returning to North America and the IHL to play for the Indianapolis Checkers at the beginning of the 1986–87 season. Conway finished the season back in the United Kingdom with the Durham Wasps who he helped to win the Heinekin Championship at Wembley Arena. He started the 1987–88 season with Durham before finishing it with the Telford Tigers in Division 1 of the BHL and earning himself the British Ice Hockey Writers Association Player of the Year trophy. After a further season with the Tigers, Conway moved to the Cleveland Bombers for the 1989–90 season, again in Division 1, where he earned a place on the Division 1 All-star team of 1990. Conway helped the Bombers to promotion to the Premier Division and stayed with them for the 1990–91 season.

Conway started his long association with Basingstoke when he joined the Beavers in the 1991–92 season playing in Division 1 of the BHL. Conway stayed with the Basingstoke team for seven seasons, helping them to promotion to the Premier Division in 1993 and into the newly formed Ice Hockey Superleague (ISL) in 1996 when the team changed its name to the Basingstoke Bison. During his time with Basingstoke, Conway earned himself two more Division 1 All-star places in 1992 and 1993 and finished as the team's all-time leading scorer with 950 points. In honour of his achievements at the club, Basingstoke retired his number 10 shirt in 2005.

Conway spent the following ISL season, 1998–99, with the Newcastle Riverkings before splitting the 1999–00 season with Hull Thunder in the British National League (BNL) and the Chelmsford Chieftains in the English Premier Ice Hockey League (EPIHL), whom he helped to win the league and playoff championships. He joined the Solihull Barons in the 2000–01 season with whom he stayed until he retired from professional ice hockey in 2004. In his final season with Solihull, Conway was the leading goal, assist and point scorer for the team.

After briefly coaching his son's junior ice hockey team, the Kingston River Rats, Conway was persuaded to come out of retirement by the Solway Sharks coach, Kevin Doherty, to play for the Sharks in the 2006–07 season in the Scottish National League and the Northern League. Conway continues to play for the Sharks in the 2007–08 season in the newly formed Scottish Premier Hockey League and the Northern League.

International
Conway made his first appearance for the Great Britain national ice hockey team at the Pool C World Championships held in Hull in 1992. Conway made an immediate impact for the team, scoring his first goal just 2 minutes and 16 seconds into his first game against Australia. Helping the GB team to win the tournament and gain promotion to Pool B, Conway scored 13 goals and 10 assists — making him the tournament leading scorer.

Conway also appeared in the 1993 GB team which won promotion to Pool A by sweeping all teams at the Pool B tournament held in the Netherlands. Conway was again the leading scorer for GB with 19 points from 8 goals an 11 assists.

Conway played for the GB team a total of 58 times between 1992 and 1999 and scored a total of 66 points from 33 goals and 33 assists.

Awards and honours
Awarded the William Hanley Trophy for the OHL's most sportsmanlike player in 1983–84.
Named to the BHL Premier Division All-star in 1986.
Named the BIHWA BHL Division 1 Player of the Year in 1987–88.
Named to the BHL Division 1 All-star team in 1990, 1992 and 1993.
Number 10 shirt retired by Basingstoke Bison in 2005.
Inducted to the British Ice Hockey Hall of Fame in 2005.

Records
Most goals (6) and most powerplay goals (4) in one game for Kingston Canadians against Belleville Bulls on 3 February 1983.
Leading goal scorer in the OHL in 1983–84.
Leading goal scorer in the BHL Premier Division in 1985–86.
Leading points scorer in the BHL Division 1 South in 1987–88.
Leading scorer in the 1992 World Championships Pool C.
All-time leading points scorer for Basingstoke Bison.
Leading goal, assist and points scorer for the Solihull MK Kings in 2003–04.

Career statistics

Club

International

Footnotes

External links
British Ice Hockey Hall of Fame entry
 

1963 births
Living people
Ayr Bruins players
Basingstoke Beavers players
Basingstoke Bison players
British Hockey League players
British Ice Hockey Hall of Fame inductees
British ice hockey right wingers
British National League (1996–2005) players
Canadian emigrants to England
 
Canadian ice hockey right wingers
Chelmsford Chieftains players
Cleveland Bombers players
Durham Wasps players
English Premier Ice Hockey League players
Hull Thunder players
Ice hockey people from Ontario
Ice Hockey Superleague players
Indianapolis Checkers players
Kingston Canadians players
Naturalised citizens of the United Kingdom
Newcastle Riverkings players
Northern League (2005–present) players
Oshawa Generals players
Sportspeople from Sault Ste. Marie, Ontario
Salt Lake Golden Eagles (IHL) players
Sault Ste. Marie Greyhounds players
Scottish National League players
Solihull Barons (2000-2002) players
Solihull MK Kings players
Solway Sharks players
Telford Tigers players
Toledo Goaldiggers players
Canadian expatriate ice hockey players in England
Canadian expatriate ice hockey players in Scotland
Canadian expatriate ice hockey players in the United States
Naturalised sports competitors